Marshall valve gear may refer to:

 Marshall valve gear, a modified Hackworth valve gear, patented in 1879 by Marshall, Sons & Co.
 J. T. Marshall valve gear, any of several valve gears invented by James Thompson Marshall

See also
 Valve gear